Sir Robert George Martin  (born 1957) is a disability rights activist from New Zealand who has promoted the self advocacy movement internationally and was involved in the proceedings resulting in the United Nations Convention on the Rights of Persons with Disabilities. He is a member of the United Nations Committee on the Rights of Persons with Disabilities for the 2017–2020 term.

Early life 

Martin was born in Whanganui, New Zealand. A difficult birth resulted in a brain injury. As a baby he was sent to Kimberley Mental Deficiency Colony (later renamed the Kimberley Centre).

Apart from brief periods living with his family and a failed attempt at fostering, Martin spent his childhood in institutions as a ward of the state. These institutions included Lake Alice Hospital (a psychiatric hospital) and Campbell Park School. In his biography, Martin describes inhumane conditions and abuse in these institutions which he would later campaign to close.

Career 

In 1972 Martin was released from care and returned to Whanganui. For a short while he lived with his parents but the relationship was characterised by violence and unhappiness. Over several years Martin lived and worked in the care of IHC New Zealand, an advocacy and care organisation for people with intellectual disabilities in New Zealand. During this period Martin began educating himself, often through books he stole. He became involved in activities to break down barriers for people with learning disabilities, including protests and non co-operation with carers. He organised a strike of intellectually disabled farm-workers.

By the time he was in his mid-twenties Martin was playing a leading role in the disability rights organisation People First. He held office at regional and national level and in 1993 traveled to Canada to represent New Zealand at a People First conference. Shortly after this Martin participated in the writing of "The Beliefs, Values, and Principles of Self-Advocacy".

In the mid-nineties Martin was appointed to the staff of IHC as a traveling advocate in New Zealand. His role was to promote self-advocacy among people with disabilities and to build public understanding that would enable the movement of people with intellectual disabilities from institutions into the community.

Martin also traveled overseas extensively for Inclusion International promoting self-advocacy. He became a council member of Inclusion International and in 2003 was appointed Inclusion International’s representative on the United Nations Ad Hoc Committee "to consider proposals for a comprehensive and integral international convention to promote and protect the rights and dignity of persons with disabilities." For a period Martin was the only person with a learning disability involved in the UN proceedings, he participated particularly in discussions around the status of families (Preamble X of the Convention) and the right of people with disabilities to live in the community (Article 19).

In 2016 Martin made history as the first person with learning disability elected onto a United Nations Treaty Body, when he was elected onto the Committee for the Rights of Persons with Disabilities.  His term on the Committee will run from 2017 to 2020. Then-New Zealand Disabilities Rights Commissioner, Paul Gibson, said "Robert Martin hasn't just smashed through a glass ceiling, he's smashed through the ceiling and walls of institutions that locked him away for most of his early years. Every New Zealander can be proud of his incredible achievement today."

In the 2020 New Year Honours, he was appointed a Knight Companion of the New Zealand Order of Merit, for services to people with disabilities.

In November 2020, he was re-elected to the United Nations Committee on the Rights of Persons with Disabilities for another term.

Honours and awards
In the 2008 New Year Honours, Martin was appointed a Member of the New Zealand Order of Merit, for services to people with disabilities. He was promoted to Knight Companion of the New Zealand Order of Merit in the 2020 New Year Honours.

Personal life
In 2014 a biography of Martin was published and he was featured in a television documentary series. The Robert Martin Self Advocate Leader Award is awarded by himself at the annual Having a Say Conference in Australia, to the participant whose self-advocacy impresses him most. Martin lives in Whanganui with his wife Lynda.

References

External links
 Television documentary about Robert Martin

Living people
New Zealand disability rights activists
1957 births
People from Whanganui
Knights Companion of the New Zealand Order of Merit